The sixth season of CSI: Crime Scene Investigation premiered on CBS on September 22, 2005, and ended May 18, 2006. The series stars William Petersen and Marg Helgenberger.

Plot
Brass, now partnered with Sofia Curtis, finds himself caught in a shootout that leaves one officer dead, and a Latino community enraged ("A Bullet Runs Through It"), before finding himself critically injured in a hostage standoff ("Bang-Bang"), in the sixth season of CSI. Meanwhile, Grissom and Willows reunite in order to investigate their toughest cases yet, including the death of a movie star ("Room Service"), a corpse discovered at a suburban home ("Bite Me"), a mass suicide at a cult ("Shooting Stars"), and an apparent suicide ("Secrets and Flies"), as Nick comes to terms with his PTSD ("Bodies in Motion"), and later tracks down a missing child ("Gum Drops"). Also this season, Nick hunts the head of a civil war reenactor ("Way to Go"), Grissom investigates the death of a psychic ("Spellbound"), and Sara comes face to face with her toughest adversary yet ("The Unusual Suspect").

In the episode Rashomama, the story is told in flashbacks by different narrations of involved characters and witnesses, a reference to the Japanese film Rashomon.

Cast

Main cast

 William Petersen as Gil Grissom, a CSI Level 3 Supervisor
 Marg Helgenberger as Catherine Willows, a CSI Level 3 Assistant Supervisor
 Gary Dourdan as Warrick Brown, a CSI Level 3
 George Eads as Nick Stokes, a CSI Level 3
 Jorja Fox as Sara Sidle, a CSI Level 3
 Eric Szmanda as Greg Sanders, a CSI Level 1
 Robert David Hall as Al Robbins, the Chief Medical Examiner
 Paul Guilfoyle as Jim Brass, a Homicide Detective Captain

Recurring cast

Episodes

References

External links
 DVD Release Dates at TVShowsOnDVD.com.

06
2005 American television seasons
2006 American television seasons